The  is a bus company within the Kanto Railway, and also belongs to Keisei Group. This company was established on 15 March 2002 to inherit the partly business of the Kanto Railway's bus department.

Overview
As part of the business efficiency, Hokota office of Kanto Railway was split into Kantetsu Melon Bus in 2001. And, in 2002, Kanto Railway established Kantetsu Green Bus as a wholly owned subsidiary in the Ishioka area. Service areas are based in Ishioka, and a part of bus routes are operated on Tsuchiura. Besides, in 2005, Kantetsu Green Bus consolidated Kantetsu Melon Bus, so the company has had bus routes which operated in the Hokota. In addition, the company has operated 
"Kashitetsu Bus" since 2007. This is a bustitution of Kashima Railway that was taken out of service in 2007. Service areas of the company have many tourist resources; Ibaraki Airport, Kairakuen and Mount Tsukuba.

History

1 June 2001 - Hokota Office of Kanto Railway was split into Kantetsu Melon Bus
30 September - A part of bus routes that had belonged to Kanshima Office of Kanto Railway was transferred to Kantetsu Melon Bus.
15 March 2002 - Kantetsu Green Bus was established 
1 July - A part of routes that had belong to Kakioka and Ishioka Office of Kanto Railway was transferred to Kantetsu Green Bus.
2005 - Kantetsu Green Bus was consolidated with Kantetsu Melon Bus which was abolished 
2007 - As Kashima Railway was taken out of service, Kashitetsu Bus was commenced operating
11 March 2010 - Airport Bus between Ibaraki Airport and Ishioka Station or Shin-Hokota Station was commenced operating
1 June 2012 - Kasumigaura Koiki Bus operated between Tsuchiura Station and Tamatsukuri Station was commenced operating
21 May 2016 - Koiki Renkei Bus operated around the Namegata・Itako・Kashima areas was commenced operating
1 September - East Exit BRT Bus Terminal was installed
16 March 2018 - IC Cards such as Suica and PASMO were adapted to use all bus routes. 
28 April - As the company has adapted IC Card since 2018, IC 1 dairy Pass Ticket for using almost bus routes of Kanto Railway Group has been sold. The ticket costs 710 yen to ride on all bus routes excluding Community buses and Highway buses and Tsukubasan Shuttle Bus.

Office
Ishioka Head Office
Kakioka Office
Hokota Office

Route

Highway bus

Route bus
KASHITETSU BUS (BRT)
Shin-Hokota Station - Hokota Station - Tamatsukuri Station - Ibaraki Airport - Ishioka Station
Kasumigaura Width Connection Bus
Tsuchiura Station - Tamatsukuri Station
Hatori Station - Itashikiyama
Kakioka Shako - Ishioka Station
Shin-Hokota Station - Mito Station (Ibaraki)
Shin-Hokota Station - Takahama Station (Ibaraki)
Ibaraki Airport - Mito Station (Ibaraki)
Ibaraki Airport - Takahama Station (Ibaraki)

Kantetsu Purple Bus

The  is a bus company within the Kanto Railway, and also belongs to Keisei Group. This company was established on 26 September 1978 to inherit the partly business of the Kanto Railway's bus department.

Overview
As part of the business efficiency, Tsukuba Kita office Shimotsuma Branch of Kanto Railway was transferred to Kantetsu Melon Bus on 1 June 2001.

See also
Kanto Railway
Kashima Railway
Keisei Bus
Tokyo BRT
Keisei Transit Bus
Tokyo Bay City Bus

References

External links
Kantetsu Green Bus/Kantetsu Purple Bus - Twitter

Transport in Ibaraki Prefecture
Bus companies of Japan
Japanese companies established in 2002